Hermitage City Hall and Jail is a historic building at 112 South Oak Street in Hermitage, Arkansas.  A modest single story yellow brick building probably built in the 1940s, its front section served as Hermitage City Hall, and the rear as the city jail, until 2000.

The building was listed on the National Register of Historic Places in 1979, at which time it was vacant.

See also
National Register of Historic Places listings in Bradley County, Arkansas

References

City and town halls on the National Register of Historic Places in Arkansas
Buildings and structures completed in 1945
National Register of Historic Places in Bradley County, Arkansas
Jails on the National Register of Historic Places in Arkansas